East Creek may refer to:

 East Creek (New Jersey), a tributary of Delaware Bay in Cape May County
East Creek, Queensland, a locality in the Shire of Croydon, Australia

See also
 East Canada Creek, a tributary of the Mohawk River in New York
 East Licking Creek, a tributary of Tuscarora Creek in Pennsylvania
 East Sandy Creek, a tributary of the Allegheny River in Pennsylvania